Fahrizal Dillah (born 14 April 1990) is an Indonesian professional footballer who plays as a striker for Liga 2 club Persiraja Banda Aceh.

Career

Persiraja
He is a product of Persiraja Banda Aceh youth academy.
He was then promoted to senior team and played for Persiraja in 2011-12 Indonesian Premier League and 2013 Indonesian Premier League, which were the highest tier Indonesian league at that time. In total, he scored 6 goals.

Semen Padang
He signed for Semen Padang in 2013 to play in Indonesia Super League. He played in 7 league games and 2 cups game without scoring any goal.

Persegres Gresik United
In 2014, he played for Persegres Gresik United, and played in 2 league games and 2 cup games, but did not score any goal.

Persiraja
He rejoined his youth club Persiraja in 2016, and became Persiraja's top goalscorer in 2016 ISC B with 11 goals.

References

External links
 
 

Living people
Indonesian footballers
1990 births
People from Sigli
Semen Padang F.C. players
Gresik United players
Persiraja Banda Aceh players
Association football forwards
Sportspeople from Aceh